Martu Wangka, or Wangkatjunga (Wangkajunga), is a variety of the Western Desert language that emerged during the 20th century in Western Australia as several indigenous communities shifted from their respective territories to form a single community. Traditionally, its speakers live in territory that is part of the Great Sandy Desert and near the Canning Stock Route, as well as Christmas Creek and Fitzroy Crossing. These are areas that are considered deserts but have many water holes that speakers travel between. There are an estimated 1,080 speakers of Martu Wangka in various communities across the Western Desert region. The largest of these communities is estimated at 100 speakers, while some of the smallest communities have as few as 15 speakers. While older speakers continue to use Martu Wangka as their primary language, younger speakers tend to understand Martu Wangka but use different languages in their daily lives. For example, many younger speakers primarily use an English-based creole commonly referred to as the Fitzroy Valley Kriol.

The alternative language name Wangkatjunga to identify this variety only appears to have emerged in the 1970s. This name is said to have been based on the words  meaning 'talk' or 'word' and  meaning 'correct' or 'straight,' so when put together, the language name essentially means 'the correct language.' It is important to note, however, that there is still some debate on how this name should be spelled, as it has been recorded differently by different linguists studying the language. A dictionary of over 400 pages was published in 1992.

History
Martu Wangka developed after two tribes, the Kartudjara and the Manjiljarra came in from the Western desert to settle into Jigalong during the 1960s. Though tribally distinct, they spoke two mutually intelligible dialects of the Western Desert language family. Through daily cohabitation, they developed what is technically known as a communalect. In this process, elements of the two languages are selected to fuse into a single shared idiom, thus forming a lingua franca distinct from the originative dialects of the various groups who settled down to live together.

Phonology

Vowels 
Martu Wangka contains three contrastive vowels, which may be either short or long. Long vowels are less common and usually occur either on the first syllable of a word or as the ending of a monosyllabic word. The chart below illustrates this:

 /i/ has allophones [i],  in free variation.
 /u/ has the allophones , .

Consonants 
There are 17 consonants in Martu Wangka, dispersed over five different places and six manners of articulation. Speakers of Martu Wangka generally do not make distinctions between voiced and voiceless stops. The apico-alveolar and apico-retroflex consonants are very similar and can be pronounced differently depending on the speaker, so it is often difficult to normalize the way these sounds are recorded.

 /k/ can have a voiced allophone  when occurring after nasal continuants, or in different intervocalic positions. It may also be heard as a voiced fricative  in intervocalic positions.
 /ɟ/ can have a voiceless fricative allophone  when occurring intervocalically.
 /ʈ/ can also be heard as tap sounds [~] in various intervocalic positions.

Syllable structure 
In Martu Wangka, most words contain two or more syllables, and most words end in vowels. Although some words may end in an apical nasal or lateral consonant, most words that would end in a consonant are appended with an epenthetic syllable '-pa' to avoid ending the word on a consonant. The most standard syllable template is CV(V)(C). The chart below shows various syllabic templates, along with examples.

Stress 
Martu Wangka has stress similar to that of other languages in its family: primary stress usually falls on the first syllable of a word, and secondary stress usually falls on the second syllable after the primary stressed syllable (essentially alternating between stressed and unstressed, marked starting from the left). The final syllable of a word is usually unstressed.

Morphology

Nominals 
In Martu Wangka, nominal morphology has affixation, reduplication, compounding, and case marking. The usual formula for constructing a noun isnominal word = nominal root – (derivation) (derivation) – inflection (inflection)

Derivational suffixes 
Nominals in Martu Wangka do not all have derivational suffixes, but when they do, these suffixes attach directly to the nominal root and then are followed by any inflectional suffixes. The usual derivational suffixes function to indicate a nominal having or lacking something, the related timing and spacing, comparison of certain properties, or number. The table below shows examples of some of the common derivational affixes associated with these groupings. The word containing the relevant suffix is bolded in each line of the gloss.

Verbs 
Martu Wangka contains around 70 basic verbs that can serve as verbal roots and then an indefinite amount of complex verbs formed through various morphological processes. These verbs contain a wide variety of meanings including but not limited to actions, motions, physical positions, sensations, and utterances. The usual formula for constructing a verb isverbal word = (direction) (preverb) verbal root (derivation) (derivation) inflection (directional affixes)

Derivational affixes 
Derivational verb morphology in Martu Wangka consists of various causatives, inchoatives, and directional affixes. Causitives include suffixes like '-ma', which creates a transitive verb from a nominal, and '-ju', which indicates that something has been put on, over, into, etc. Inchoatives serve as change-of-state verbs and modify nominals that describe various states of existence like being alive or cold. Directional affixes are used to modify existing verbs and indicate the type or direction of action.

Inflectional affixes 
Inflectional affixes on verbs are used to indicate tense and how the speaker feels about the action that the verbal root describes. Tense affixes include indicators of present, past, future, perfective, and imperfective tenses. Feeling affixes can be used to inflect when a speaker wants something to happen, is trying to make something happen, believes that something should happen, and to discuss hypothetical scenarios.

There are four different conjugation classes that determine how verbs realize various inflectional morphemes: the ø class, wa class, rra class, and la class. These classes are organized by shared characteristics of the imperative form of the verb.

Reduplication 
There is both nominal and verbal reduplication in Martu Wangka, which is usually used to generate a new word with related meaning, but can also be used to emphasize certain actions or traits. Nominal reduplication has two types: reduplication and frozen reduplication. With reduplication, the nominal is repeated, which creates a new reduplicated nominal. With frozen reduplication, only the reduplicated form of the nominal is in the language and the non-reduplicated form does not exist.

Verbal reduplication can be both partial, full, and frozen reduplication. To form a reduplicated verb, usually the verb root or the preverb of a compound verb is reduplicated. It is typically used when creating a word for an action that repeats itself, such as going around in circles.

Compounding 
Compound nominals are formed in two ways: either two independent roots are put together to form a new word with a separate meaning, or one independent root is put together with another root that does not contain independent meaning. The majority of compound nominals are words for various plants and animals, but they are also formed to describe words originally not in Martu Wangka.

Compound verbs consist of a preverb, which can be either a nominal or an independent class, and a verbal root. Verbal roots are simple verbs that contain the core meaning of the compound verb. Some examples of compounding on verbals roots are illustrated below.

Case and agreement

Grammatical case marking 
The system of case and agreement in Martu Wangka is Ergative-Absolutive. The suffix associated with the absolutive case is -ø, which indicates lack of a suffix, and the suffixes associated with the ergative case are -lu when preceded by a vowel and -ju or -tu when preceded by a consonant. Martu Wangka also contains a third grammatical case known as the dative case, which serves to mark the purpose of an action and is suffixed with -ku. The examples below show these three types of grammatical case marking.

These grammatical cases are particularly important in a language like Martu Wangka because it has very free word order, so these case markings serve to indicate the functions of and relationships between nominals in a sentence. For example, these cases can indicate subject and object, agent and experiencer (of an action), force of an action (such as when an object causes something to happen instead of a human), purpose of an action, and even beneficiary of an action.

Semantic case marking 
While the ergative and absolutive markings serve primarily grammatical functions, Martu Wangka also contains case markings that can be loosely categorized as semantic markings. Semantic case markings are considered an extension of the argument and are used primarily to relate the argument to a location. For example, the locative case indicates the location of an argument, the perlative case describes an object moving along a path within a location, the allative case describes an object moving to a location, and the ablative case describes an object moving away from a location.

Syntax

Word order 
Martu Wangka has free word order, meaning that there is no grammatical basic word order. Instead, words are ordered semantically and the most important parts of the sentence come the earliest in the sentence. For example, new information introduced into a conversation tends to come before information that has already been discussed. In a narrative about a journey, information about direction and distance comes first because those are the most important things for travelers to know. Some examples are shown below.

Questions 
Martu Wangka has tag questions, in which certain questions are followed by a tag that indicates the type of question. The tag always comes at the end of the question. For example, the  tag comes at the end of a yes/no question and the 'you know' tag, which is borrowed from English, is common at the end of rhetorical questions as an afterthought.

These interrogative nominals always come at the start of a clause.

See also
Ngurrara, a grouping of peoples of language groups including Martu Wangka

References

Sources

OBJ:object
SIM:similar
TAG:question tag

Western Desert language